Cnemaspis kohukumburai, or Kohukumbura's day gecko, is a species of diurnal gecko endemic to island of Sri Lanka.

Etymology
The specific name kohukumburai is named in honor of Sri Lankan warrior Kohukumbure Walauwe Rate Rala, who is a national hero fought in the Great Rebellion of 1817–1818 occurred in Uva-Wellassa against British rule. It was the third Kandyan War led by Keppetipola Disawe.

Taxonomy
The species is closely related to  C. alwisi and C. rajakarunai.

Ecology
The species was discovered from area lies between 354 and 567 meters above sea level of a tropical wet evergreen forest, Kadugannawa. Individuals are restricted to rock outcrops and granite caves in forested areas. It is sympatric with many geckoes such as Cnemaspis kandiana, Gehyra mutilata, Hemidactylus depressus, H. frenatus, H. parvimaculatus, Hemiphyllodactylus typus. Researchers identified the species is Critically Endangered due to low numbers and density only recorded from three locations.

Description
An adult male is 33.9 mm long. Dorsum homogeneous with smooth granular scales. Chin, gular, pectoral and abdominal scales are smooth. There are 23 belly scales across mid body. Tubercles on posterior flank are well developed. Para vertebral granules linearly arranged. Body short and slender. Head large and depressed. Snout relatively short. Pupil round. Head, body and limbs are light brown and light grey dorsally. There are five irregular cloud-like black bands on the dorsum. Two oblique black and white lines present between the eye and nostrils. A straight, dark brown postorbital stripe present. Broad dark spots present on occipital area. Lateral surfaces of trunk covered with irregular cream white spots. Tail brownish with nine faded grey cross-bands.

Media controversy
Several Sri Lankan media as well many parliamentarians criticized the usage of popular people's name for specific name. The argument was largely due to unknowing about binomial nomenclature in zoological taxonomy among people. They indicated that the usage of heroes' names gives by equating the national heroes to geckos. However, researchers neglect that sentence and explained that the name is given only to honor the personality.

References

Reptiles of Sri Lanka
kohukumburai
Reptiles described in 2019